Étienne Ludovic Youte Kinkoue (born 14 January 2002) is a French professional footballer who plays as a centre-back for Ligue 2 club Le Havre.

Career
In 2019, Kinkoue joined the youth academy of Italian Serie A side Inter from the youth academy of Troyes in the French second division. In 2021, he signed for Greek second division club Olympiacos B and debuted for Olympiacos B on 20 November during a 1–0 win over AEL (Larissa).

On 11 January 2023, Kinkoue signed for Ligue 2 club Le Havre on a three-year contract.

International career
Born in France, Youte Kinkoue is of Cameroonian descent. He is a youth international for France, having played for the France U17s.

References

External links

2002 births
Living people
Footballers from Lyon
French footballers
France youth international footballers
French sportspeople of Cameroonian descent
Association football defenders
ES Troyes AC players
Inter Milan players
Olympiacos F.C. B players
Le Havre AC players
Super League Greece 2 players
French expatriate footballers
French expatriate sportspeople in Greece
French expatriate sportspeople in Italy
Expatriate footballers in Greece
Expatriate footballers in Italy